Augustus Frederick Stoneman (April 2, 1832 – April 10, 1905) was a merchant and political figure in Nova Scotia, Canada. He represented Yarmouth County in the Nova Scotia House of Assembly from 1900 to 1903 as a Liberal member.

He was born in Yarmouth, Nova Scotia, the son of Joseph Stoneman and Mary Lewis. In 1859, he married Maria D. Richan. Stoneman was a justice of the peace and served as mayor of Yarmouth in 1899. Stoneman was elected to the provincial assembly in a 1900 by-election held after William Law resigned his seat. He was named to the province's Legislative Council in 1903 and served until his death in Yarmouth at the age of 73.

References
 A Directory of the Members of the Legislative Assembly of Nova Scotia, 1758-1958, Public Archives of Nova Scotia (1958)

1832 births
1905 deaths
Nova Scotia Liberal Party MLAs
People from Yarmouth, Nova Scotia
Mayors of places in Nova Scotia
Nova Scotia Liberal Party MLCs